Live at the Hollywood Bowl is the third official live album by the American rock band the Doors, released in May 1987 by Elektra Records. The concert was recorded on July 5, 1968, at the Hollywood Bowl in Los Angeles, the Doors' hometown.

At a length of 22 minutes and 19 seconds, the 1987 album is the Doors' shortest official release. A VHS video of the concert was also released, containing 14 songs. The full version of the concert, entitled Live at the Bowl '68, was released in October 2012 on CD, LP and Blu-ray Disc. A shortened version of the concert is on The Doors - 30 Years Commemorative Edition DVD.

Recording

The entire concert was recorded using several cameras and is one of only two professionally recorded live performances of the band in color (the other being Live at The Isle of Wight Festival 1970). The Doors' long-time sound engineer Bruce Botnick recorded the concert direct from the soundboard onto an 8-track machine. The recording of "The End" was used in the film project Feast of Friends, which was not released until November 2014.

Initial sound problems with Morrison's microphone made the opening song ("When the Music's Over"), as well as three other songs ("Hello, I Love You", "The WASP (Texas Radio and the Big Beat)" and "Spanish Caravan") somewhat distorted. This was digitally rectified for the 2012 release by Bruce Botnick, using various clips of Morrison's voice from other recordings, including their 1970 live album "Absolutely Live". The 2012 edition of the concert also made use of some different camera angles than the version released on video in 1987.

Critical reception

Bruce Eder, in a review for AllMusic, gave the album three and a half out of five stars, calling it "a good companion to the other live archival issues of its era, although none of it holds a candle to the New York concert included in The Doors: Box Set [1997]".

Track listing

1987 LP version
All tracks are written by the Doors (Jim Morrison, Ray Manzarek, Robby Krieger and John Densmore), except where noted.  Details are taken from the 1987 Elektra Records album and may differ from other sources.

1987 CD version

Tracks 1, 4, and 5 are from "Celebration of the Lizard".

2012 version (Live at the Bowl '68)

Video version

1987/2000 version

 "When the Music's Over"
 "Alabama Song (Whisky Bar)" (Bertolt Brecht, Kurt Weill)
 "Back Door Man" (Willie Dixon)
 "Five to One"
 "Back Door Man" (Reprise)
 "Moonlight Drive"
 "Horse Latitudes"
 "A Little Game" (Excerpt from "Celebration of the Lizard")
 "The Hill Dwellers" (Excerpt from "The Celebration of the Lizard")
 "Spanish Caravan" (Edited version)
 "Wake Up"
 "Light My Fire"
 "The Unknown Soldier"
 "The End"

2012 version
 Show Start/Intro
 "When The Music’s Over"
 "Alabama Song (Whisky Bar)" (Bertolt Brecht, Kurt Weill)
 "Back Door Man" (Willie Dixon)
 "Five To One"
 "Back Door Man" (reprise) (Dixon)
 "The WASP" (Texas Radio and the Big Beat)
 "Hello, I Love You"
 "Moonlight Drive"
 "Horse Latitudes"
 "A Little Game"
 "The Hill Dwellers"
 "Spanish Caravan"
 "Hey, What Would You Guys Like to Hear?"
 "Wake Up!"
 "Light My Fire" (Segue)
 "Light My Fire"
 "The Unknown Soldier"
 "The End" (Segue)
 "The End"

Special Features

 Echoes from the Bowl
 You Had to Be There
 Reworking the Doors
 Television Performances:
 "Wild Child" (from The Smothers Brothers Show, 1968)
 "Light My Fire" (from The Jonathan Winters Show, 1967)
 "Gloria" (music video)

Personnel
The Doors
Jim Morrison – vocals, percussion
Ray Manzarek – keyboards, keyboard bass, background vocals
Robby Krieger – electric guitar
John Densmore – drums

References

1987 live albums
Albums produced by Paul A. Rothchild
Albums recorded at the Hollywood Bowl
Bright Midnight Archives
Elektra Records live albums
The Doors live albums